In Greek mythology, the name Hodites (Ancient Greek: Ὁδίτην ) may refer to:

Hodites, a Centaur at the wedding of Pirithous and Hippodamia, killed by Mopsus.
Hodites, killed by Clymenus during the battle between Perseus and Phineus.
Hodites, the name used by Diodorus Siculus for one of the sons of Heracles and Deianeira instead of "Oneites".

Notes

References 

 Diodorus Siculus, The Library of History translated by Charles Henry Oldfather. Twelve volumes. Loeb Classical Library. Cambridge, Massachusetts: Harvard University Press; London: William Heinemann, Ltd. 1989. Vol. 3. Books 4.59–8. Online version at Bill Thayer's Web Site
 Diodorus Siculus, Bibliotheca Historica. Vol 1-2. Immanel Bekker. Ludwig Dindorf. Friedrich Vogel. in aedibus B. G. Teubneri. Leipzig. 1888-1890. Greek text available at the Perseus Digital Library.
 Publius Ovidius Naso, Metamorphoses translated by Brookes More (1859-1942). Boston, Cornhill Publishing Co. 1922. Online version at the Perseus Digital Library.
 Publius Ovidius Naso, Metamorphoses. Hugo Magnus. Gotha (Germany). Friedr. Andr. Perthes. 1892. Latin text available at the Perseus Digital Library.

Centaurs
Metamorphoses characters
Characters in Greek mythology